Cleora transversaria is a moth of the  family Geometridae. It is found in the Comoros.

References

Cleora
Moths described in 1907
Moths of Africa